{| 

{{Infobox ship career
| Hide header=
|Ship country=Great Britain
|Ship flag=
| Ship name = Dispatch'
| Ship namesake = 
| Ship owner =
| Ship operator = 
| Ship ordered = 
| Ship builder = Bermuda
| Ship original cost = 
| Ship laid down = 
| Ship launched = 1784
| Ship acquired = 
| Ship commissioned = 
| Ship decommissioned = 
| Ship in service = 
| Ship out of service = 
| Ship renamed = 
| Ship captured = December 1795
| Ship fate = 
| Ship status = 
| Ship notes = 
}}

|}Dispatch was built in Bermuda in 1784 and came to England possibly as early as 1786. In 1792 she made a voyage as a slave ship carrying slaves from Africa to the West Indies in the triangular trade in enslaved people. She was then briefly a privateer before returning to the slave trade. The French captured her in 1795 while she was on her third slave trading voyage.

CareerDispatch first appeared in Lloyd's Register (LR) in 1789. Missing issues or missing pages in extant issues mean she may have appeared earlier. Dispatch, Croke, master, first appeared in the ship arrival and departure (SAD) data in Lloyd's List (LL) in 1787.

1st enslaving voyage (1792–1793): Captain Caleb Gardner sailed from Liverpool to Africa on 7 May 1792. Dispatch arrived at Saint Ann's Bay, Jamaica on 23 November. There she delivered an estimated 200 captives. She sailed for home on 1 January 1793 and arrived back at Liverpool on 15 February 93. She had left Liverpool with 15 crew members and suffered one crew member death on her voyage.

Shortly after Dispatch returned, war with France broke out. Her owners decided to send her privateering.

Captain John Bollis acquired a letter of marque on 30 April 1793. LL carried only one mention of her taking a prize. In July, the "Dispatch privateer", of Liverpool, recaptured Three Brothers, of Dartmouth, which was laden with fish. Three Brothers had been on her way from Bergen to Venice with a cargo of stockfish when she had been captured.Dispatchs owners removed her from privateering. On 31 October Captain Edward Jackson acquired a letter of marque, but with a third fewer men and guns than before. She then returned to the slave trade.

2nd enslaving voyage (1793–1794): Captain Edward Jackson sailed from Liverpool on 22 December 1793, bound for West Africa. Dispatch arrived at Kingston on 15 June 1794. There she landed 146 captives. She sailed from Kingston on 9 July 1794 and arrived at Liverpool on 18 September 1794. She had left Liverpool with 17 crew members and suffered one crew death on the voyage.

3rd enslaving voyage (1794–loss): Captain Jackson sailed from Liverpool on 20 November 1794, bound for Malembo. She sailed from Africa on 1 November.

FateLloyd's List reported that a French privateer had captured three British slave ships off the west coast of Hispaniola on about 15 December 1795 as they were on their way to Jamaica. Dispatch, Jackson, master, was carrying 250 captives. Cyclops, Grice, master, was carrying 470 captives. , Williams, master, was carrying 411 captives.Dispatch arrived at Saint Vincent, most of which was then under French control as a result of the Second Carib War. There Dispatch'' landed 158 captives on 1 December.

In 1795, 50 British enslaving ships were lost. This was the largest annual loss in the period 1793 to 1807. Seven enslaving slave ships were lost on their way from Africa to the West Indies. Still, During the period 1793 to 1807, war, rather than maritime hazards or resistance by the captives, was the greatest cause of vessel losses among British slave vessels.

Notes

Citations

References
 
 

1784 ships
Ships built in Bermuda
Age of Sail merchant ships of England
Liverpool slave ships
Privateer ships of Great Britain
Captured ships